Wisconsin v. Jonas Yoder, 406 U.S. 205 (1972), is the case in which the United States Supreme Court found that Amish children could not be placed under compulsory education past 8th grade.  The parents' fundamental right to freedom of religion was determined to outweigh the state's interest in educating their children. The case is often cited as a basis for parents' right to educate their children outside of traditional private or public schools.

Background of the case
Three Amish students from three different families stopped attending the New Glarus High School in the New Glarus, Wisconsin, school district at the end of the eighth grade because of their parent's religious beliefs.  The three families were represented by Jonas Yoder (one of the fathers involved in the case) when the case went to trial.  They were convicted in the Green County Court. Each defendant was fined the nominal sum of $5. Thereafter the Wisconsin Supreme Court found in Yoder's favor. Thereupon, Wisconsin appealed that ruling in the US Supreme Court.

The Amish did not believe in going to court to settle disputes but instead follow the biblical command to "turn the other cheek."   Thus, the Amish are at a disadvantage when it comes to defending themselves in courts or before legislative committees.  However, a Lutheran minister, Reverend William C. Lindholm, took an interest in Amish legal difficulties from a religious freedom perspective and founded The National Committee for Amish Religious Freedom (partly as a result of this case) and then provided them with legal counsel.

Under Amish church standards, higher education was deemed not only unnecessary for their simple way of life, but also endangering to their salvation.  These men appealed for exemption from compulsory education on the basis of these religious convictions.  They sincerely held to the belief that the values their children would learn at home would surpass the worldly knowledge taught in school.

Court's decision
The U.S. Supreme Court ruled in favor of Yoder in its decision. Justice William O. Douglas filed a partial dissent, but voted with the court regarding Yoder's case. Justices Lewis F. Powell, Jr. and William H. Rehnquist took no part in the consideration or decision of the case.

The Wisconsin Supreme Court "sustained respondents' claim that application of the compulsory school-attendance law to them violated their rights under the Free Exercise Clause of the First Amendment, made applicable to the States by the Fourteenth Amendment."

The U.S. Supreme Court held as follows:

 States cannot force individuals to attend school when it infringes on their First Amendment rights. In this case, the state of Wisconsin interfered with the practice of a legitimate religious belief.
 Not all beliefs rise to the demands of the religious clause of the First Amendment. There needs to be evidence of true and objective religious practices, instead of an individual making his or her standards on such matters. The Amish way of life is one of deep religious convictions that stems from the Bible. It is determined by their religion, which involves their rejection of worldly goods and their living in the Biblical simplicity. The modern compulsory secondary education is in sharp conflict with their way of life.
 With respect to the State of Wisconsin's argument that additional modern education beyond 8th grade is necessary to prepare citizens to participate effectively and productively in America's political system, the Court disagreed. It argued that the State provided no evidence showing any great benefit to having two extra years in the public schools. Furthermore, the Court contended that the Amish community was a very successful social unit in American society, a self-sufficient, law-abiding member of society, which paid all of the required taxes and rejected any type of public welfare. The Amish children, upon leaving the public school system, continued their education in the form of vocational training.
 The Court found no evidence that by leaving the Amish community without two additional years of schooling, young Amish children would become burdens on society. To the contrary, the Court argued that they had good vocational background to rely upon. It was the State's mistaken assumption that Amish children were ignorant. Compulsory education after elementary school was a recent movement that developed in the early 20th century in order to prevent child labor and keep children of certain ages in school. The State of Wisconsin's arguments about compelling the school attendance were therefore less substantial.
 Responding to Justice Douglas's dissent, the Court argued that the question before it was about the interests of the parents to exercise free religion, and did not relate to the child's First Amendment's rights. As such, the argument pertaining to the child's right to exercise free religion was irrelevant in this case.

Justice Potter Stewart, joined by Justice William J. Brennan,  Jr., filed a concurring opinion stating that the 'interesting and important' questions raised by Justice Douglas' dissent were moot since the Amish children shared their parents' religious objections to the school attendance. 

Justice Byron White, joined by Justices Brennan and Stewart, filed a concurring opinion saying the case 'would be a very different case' if the parents forbade their children from 'attending any school at any time and from complying in any way with the educational standards set by the State'; he pointed out that the burden on the children was relatively slight since they had acquired 'the basic tools of literacy to survive in modern society' and had attended eight grades of school.

Dissenting opinion
Justice William O. Douglas, who dissented in part, wrote:

Legacy of the Court's decision
The ruling is cited as a basis for allowing people to be educated outside traditional private or public schools, such as with homeschooling.

The implications of the case for the Amish were characterized by one author as:

Since Wisconsin v. Yoder,  all states must grant the Old Order Amish the right to establish their own schools (should they choose) or to withdraw from public institutions after completing eighth grade. In some communities Amish parents have continued to send their children to public elementary schools even after Wisconsin v. Yoder.  In most places tensions eased considerably after the Supreme Court ruling, although certain difficulties remained for those Amish living in Nebraska.

See also
 List of United States Supreme Court cases, volume 406

Notes and references

Further reading

External links
 
 
 
 The Principle of Nonresistance - written in 1927 by John Horsch, a Mennonite historian and church leader.
 
 
 
 
 
 
 

Amish in the United States
United States Supreme Court cases of the Burger Court
United States free exercise of religion case law
United States education case law
1972 in United States case law
1972 in religion
Legal history of Wisconsin
1972 in education
1972 in Wisconsin
United States Supreme Court cases